The 2011 Illinois Fighting Illini football team represented the University of Illinois at Urbana–Champaign in the 2011 NCAA Division I FBS football season. The Fighting Illini, who were led during the regular season by seventh-year head coach Ron Zook, are members of the Big Ten Conference in the Legends Division and played their home games at Memorial Stadium.  Zook was fired after the team lost the final six games of its regular season.  Defensive coordinator Vic Koenning was appointed as interim head coach led the team in the Kraft Fight Hunger Bowl.  On December 9, Illinois hired Tim Beckman as their new permanent head coach.

The Illini set a record that season, becoming the first NCAA FBS team to start their season off 6–0, but finish 6–6. All of their six losses came against Big Ten Conference opponents.

Before the team's appearance in the Kraft Fight Hunger Bowl, nearly all of their assistant coaches were fired, as well as head coach Ron Zook.

The 2011 season ended with a 7–6 overall record, 2–6 in Big Ten play to finish 5th in Leaders Division, with a victory over UCLA in the Kraft Fight Hunger Bowl.

Schedule

Game summaries

Arkansas State

Illinois opened the year at home for the first time since 2006.  The opener was the first of eight home games for the Illini.  After a slow start and falling behind 8–7 with 2:50 left in the 2nd quarter, the Illini scored a touchdown and a late field goal to take a 17 8 halftime lead.  The offense continued to roll in the 2nd half as Illinois extended the lead to win the contest 33 15.

Illinois quarterback Nathan Scheelhaase led the Illini offense, finishing 16 for 23 on pass attempts totaling in 267 yards and two touchdowns.  A.J. Jenkins was a favorite target for Scheelhaase, grabbing 11 receptions for 148 yards and 1 TD.  Darius Millines also hauled in a TD and finished with 119 yards on 5 receptions.  Jason Ford led the rushing attack with 86 yards on 22 carries and 2 touchdowns.

South Dakota State

Arizona State

Western Michigan

Northwestern

Indiana

Ohio State

Purdue

Penn State

Michigan

Wisconsin

Minnesota

UCLA (Kraft Fight Hunger Bowl)

The Bruins, with a losing record, were granted a waiver to play in a bowl game by the NCAA on November 30, 2011 since their seventh loss was played in the post-season Pac-12 Championship Game. The Bruins were coached by interim head coach Mike Johnson, who replaced Rick Neuheisel.

Second Quarter scoring: UCLA – Taylor Embree 16-yard pass from Kevin Prince (Tyler Gonzalez kick); ILL – Derek Dimke 36-yard field goal

Third Quarter scoring: ILL – T. Hawthorne 39-yard interception return (Dimke kick)

Fourth Quarter scoring: ILL – Dimke 37-yard field goal; ILL – A. J. Jenkins 60-yard pass from N. Scheelhaase (Dimke kick); UCLA – Nelson Rosario 38-yard pass from Prince (Gonzalez kick)

Rankings

References

Illinois
Illinois Fighting Illini football seasons
Redbox Bowl champion seasons
Illinois Fighting Illini football